California's state elections were held on November 5, 2002. Necessary primary elections were held on March 5. Up for election were all the seats of the California State Assembly, 20 seats of the California Senate, seven constitutional officers, all the seats of the California Board of Equalization, as well as votes on retention of two Supreme Court justices and various appeals court judges. Seven ballot measures were also up for approval. Municipal offices were also included in the election.

The incumbent governor Gray Davis won reelection with less than 50% of the vote over his Republican challenger Bill Simon.  Democrats also won every other statewide office and maintained their majorities in both houses of the state legislature.

Constitutional Offices

Governor

Final results from the California Secretary of State:

Lieutenant Governor

Final results from the California Secretary of State:

Secretary of State

Final results from the California Secretary of State:

Controller

Final results from the California Secretary of State:

Treasurer

Final results from the California Secretary of State:

Attorney General

Final results from the California Secretary of State:

Insurance Commissioner

Final results from the California Secretary of State:

Board of Equalization

Overview

District 1
Final results from the California Secretary of State:

District 2
Final results from the California Secretary of State:

District 3
Final results from the California Secretary of State:

District 4
Final results from the California Secretary of State:

Judicial system

Supreme Court of California
Final results from the California Secretary of State:

California Courts of Appeal
See California Courts of Appeal elections, 2002.

California State Legislature elections

State Senate

There are 40 seats in the State Senate. For this election, candidates running in odd-numbered districts ran for four-year terms.

State Assembly

All 80 biennially elected seats of the State Assembly were up for election this year. Each seat has a two-year term. The Democrats retained control of the State Assembly.

Statewide ballot propositions
Seven propositions qualified to be listed on the general election ballot in California. Five of them passed.

Proposition 46
Proposition 46 would create a trust fund by selling $2.1 billion in general obligation funds to fund 21 types of housing programs, including multifamily, individual and farmworker housing. Proposition 46 passed with 57.5% approval.

Proposition 47
The state would sell $13 billion in general obligation bonds for construction and renovation of K-12 school facilities and higher education facilities. Proposition 47 passed with 59% approval.

Proposition 48
Would amend the Constitution to delete references to the municipal courts. Proposition 48 passed with 72.8% approval.

Proposition 49
Would substantially increase funding for before and after-school programs, and make general funds permanently earmarked for the programs beginning in the 2004-2005 school year. Proposition 49 passed with 56.6% approval.

Proposition 50
The state would borrow $3.4 billion through the sale of general obligation bonds for water projects. Proposition 50 passed with 55.4% approval.

Proposition 51
Would permanently allocate sales and use taxes raised from the sale or lease of motor vehicles to specific transportation projects. Proposition 51 failed with 41.4% approval.

Proposition 52
Would allow legally eligible California residents presenting proof of current residence to register to vote on Election Day (same-day voter registration). Proposition 52 failed with 40.6% approval.

References

External links
"A directory of California state propositions"
Official election results form the California Secretary of State

See also
California State Legislature
California State Assembly, California State Assembly elections, 2002
California State Senate, California State Senate elections, 2002
Political party strength in U.S. states
Political party strength in California
Elections in California

 
California